Navidades is the 17th studio album by Mexican singer Luis Miguel, released on 14 November 2006 by Warner Music Latina. It is Miguel's first Christmas album, in which the singer interprets traditional English-language carols in Spanish. The songs were adapted by  Édgar Cortázar and Juan Carlos Calderón while the artist handled the album's production himself. Musically, the album consists of big band numbers  and string-laden ballads. Two singles were simultaneously released as lead singles to promote the album: "Mi Humilde Oración" and "Santa Claus Llegó a la Ciudad". To further promote the record, Luis Miguel performed two tracks from the album on the set list for the third leg of his México En La Piel Tour (2005–07) on November and December 2006.

Upon its release, Navidades received mostly positive reviews from music critics, commending Luis Miguel's vocals and the musical styles. However, the adaptations were met with mixed reactions from reviewers.  Navidades was nominated as Best Latin Pop Album at the 50th Annual Grammy Awards (2008) as well as Latin Pop Album of the Year by a Male Artist at the 2007 Latin Billboard Music Awards. Commercially, Navidades reached number one in Mexico and the Billboard Top Latin Albums chart in the United States and the top-ten in Argentina and Spain. It was also the first Spanish-language album to rank on the Billboard Top Holiday Albums since 1966. By November 2015, the record had sold over 1.1 million copies.

Background and recording
In 2004, Luis Miguel released México en la Piel, a collection of mariachi standards. He spent two years promoting the album through the México En La Piel Tour (2005–07). After the finishing the third leg of the tour in April 2006 at the Mandalay Bay Events Center in Las Vegas, Nevada, Miguel decided to take a break from performing. He announced that he would released a new album and resume touring by the end of the year. Further information about the next record were revealed on 5 October 2006 including its release date on 14 November 2006 and that it would be a holiday album of 11 traditional Christmas carols sung in Spanish. Miguel held a press conference on the eve of the album's release, where he explained the concept of the album: "The conception of this album, Navidades, I have been maturing for years because I have always felt that at Christmas there are great records in English, but not in Spanish. So it seemed like a good idea to record one."

Navidades was recorded in Hollywood and New York City produced by the artist himself. Musically, the albums consists of big-band uptempo numbers and string-laden ballads. Miguel recruited Calderón (who has worked with Miguel since the 1980s) and Édgar Cortázar to write the Spanish-language versions of the songs. While several tracks such as "Santa Claus is Comin' to Town" were translated, other songs including "Rudolph the Red-Nose Reindeer" were adapted in Spanish with lyrics being unrelated to the original. In the case of the latter, it was reworked as "Frente a la Chimenea" ("In Front of the Chimney") and makes no mention of the titular character. "They wanted lyrics Luis Miguel style" according to Cortázar.

Promotion 

"Mi Humilde Oración" and "Santa Claus Llegó a la Ciudad" were simultaneously released as the album's lead singles on 23 October 2006. The former single peaked at number 31 on the Billboard Latin Pop Airplay chart while latter ranked at number 26 on the same chart. The music video for "Santa Claus Llegó a la Ciudad" was filmed in New York City, directed by Rebecca Blake and released on 21 November 2006. To further promote Navidades, "Santa Claus Llegó a la Ciudad" and "Frente a la Chimenea" were included on the set list for the third leg of the México En La Piel Tour in November and December 2006.

Critical reception and accolades

Upon its release, Navidades was met with generally mostly positive reactions from music critics. Billboards Leila Cobo noted that while "hearing these songs in Spanish be disconcerting to some, where the lyrics completely from the originals", she felt that Miguel's traditional arrangements "work well for the uptempo numbers" and the "string-laden contemplative fare".  The Reforma critic Beto Castillo called it a " very well made album, surrounded by great talents in every way" and praised both the arrangements and musicians. However, Castillo did not enjoy some of the adaptations including "Frente la Chimenea" by Cortázar and preferred Calderón's take on the songs. R. Garza of Vida en el Valle rated the album five stars complimenting Miguel's voice, the big band arrangements, and his take on "Noche de Paz". Garza lamented as it is a holiday, it only be listened to during holiday season and felt Miguel could've recorded more tracks and include a DVD. A writer Vista magazine gave the album a positive review, lauding its "glorious" sound and opined the adaptations a "new resonance for the family, evokes happiness, and hopes of the holidays, and emotion and nostalgia of the season".

Charlie Fidelman of the Montreal Gazette rated the album three-and-a-half out of five stars, highlighting the artist's ability to stay "romantic in all guises" and complimented his "expressive tenor voice" along with the big-band ensemble. AllMusic reviewer Evan C. Gutierrez was more critical of the album, giving the album two stars. He criticized  the singer for not having "a drop of class or elegance that comes with such commitment" in regards to recording a jazz album. Gutierrez also regarded the choices as "more silly than playful and his performances hit overkill by the first chorus on virtually every track.  Gutierrez concluded: "Miguel in a cheap Santa suit brandishing a glass of whiskey and a cigarette between his lips may be more truthful advertising than the candlelight photo that actually adorns the cover." Similarly, Eliseo Cardona listed Navidades as one of the worst albums of 2006, stating that nobody should have to pay the artist to "hear him sing Christmas songs that in gringo land are already taken for guachafas."

At the 50th Annual Grammy Awards in 2008, Navidades was nominated Best Latin Pop Album, it was the first Christmas album to be nominated in this category,  but lost to El Tren de los Momentos (2006) by Alejandro Sanz. It was also nominated in the category of Latin Pop Album by a Male Artist at the 2007 Latin Billboard Music Awards but ultimately lost to Amor (2006) by Andrea Bocelli.

Commercial performance
In Mexico, it debuted at the top of the Top 100 Mexico chart and spent three weeks on this spot. Navidades was certified diamond by AMPROFON almost two months after its launch for sales of 500,000 copies and was the fourth best-selling album of 2006 in the country. By October 2008 the album reported 700,000 units sold in Mexico alone. In the US, Navidades debuted and peaked at number 51 in the Billboard 200 on the week of 2 December 2006, and was the first all-Spanish album to appear on Billboard's holiday chart since 1966, peaking at number 7 on this chart. In addition, the record debuted at number one on the Billboard Top Latin Albums chart. It sold 145,000 units in the country up to July 2009 and was awarded a double platinum certification in the Latin field by the Recording Industry Association of America for shipments of 200,000 units.

In Spain, Navidades reached number four on its album charts and was certified gold by PROMUSICAE for shipping over 40,000 copies, making it the 34th best selling album of the year. In Argentina, the disc reached number two, and was certified platinum by CAPIF. Additionally it was certified gold in Chile and Venezuela. , Navidades had sold over 1.1 million units worldwide.

Track listing
All tracks produced by Luis Miguel.

Personnel
Adapted from the Navidades liner notes:

Performance credits

Musicians
Robbie Buchanan – electric piano , hammond organ 
Michael Lang – piano 
Francisco Loyo – piano 
Randy Waldman – piano 
Nathan East – bass 
Abraham Laboriel – bass 
Robert Hurst – bass 
Vinnie Colaiuta – drums 
John Robinson – drums 
George Doering – guitar 
Paul Jackson Jr. – guitar 
Thomas Aros – percussion 
Dan Higgins – alto saxophone, tenor saxophone 
Robert Carr – saxophone 
Keith Fiddmont – saxophone 
Brandon Fields – saxophone 
Robert Lockart – saxophone 
Thomas Peterson – saxophone 
Bijon Watson – trumpet 
Gilberto Castellanos – trumpet 
Charles Davis – trumpet 
Ronald King – trumpet, trombone 
George Bohanan – trombone 
Richard Bullock – trombone 
Ira Nepus – trombone 
Orchestra
Brian Byrne – orchestra director 
Timothy Davis – orchestra director 
Bruce Dukov – director, first violin 
Ralph Morrison – director, first violin  
Razdan Kuyumjian – violin 
John Wittenberg – violin 
Armen Anassian – violin 
Charlie Bisharat – violin 
Caroline Campbell – violin 
Kevin Connolly – violin  
Mario DeLeon – violin 
Julie Gigante – violin 
Alan Grunfeld – violin 
Peter Kent – violin 
Natalie Leggett – violin 
Phillip Levy – violin 
Liane Mautner – violin 
Horia Moroaica – violin 
Sid Page – violin 
Alyssa Park – violin 
Sara Parkins – violin 
Michele Richards – violin 
Guillermo Romero – violin 
Josefina Vergara – violin 
Margaret Wooten – violin 
Jackie Brand – violin 
Rebecca Bunnell – violin 
Nicole Bush – violin 
Franklyn D'Antonio – violin 
Kristin Fife – violin 
Clayton Haslop – violin 
Tiffnay Yi Hu – violin 
Patricia Johnson – violin 
Aimee Kreston – violin 
Robert Matsuda – violin 
Frances Moore – violin 
Robert Peterson – violin 
Tereza Stanislav – violin 
Rachel Stegeman – violin 
Charles Stegeman – violin 
Edmund Stein – violin 
Mari Tsumura – violin 
Miwako Watanabe – violin 
Andrew Duckles – viola 
Matthew Funes – viola 
Keith Greene – viola 
Shawn Mann – viola 
Dan Neufeld – viola 
Karie Prescott – viola 
Harry Shrinian – viola 
David Walther – viola 
Robert Berg – viola 
Robert Brophy – viola 
Ken Burward-Hoy – viola 
Carole Kleister Castillo – viola 
John Hayhurst – viola 
Carrie Holzman-Little – viola 
Renita Koven – viola 
Carolyn Riley – viola 
Larry Corbett – cello 
Paula Hochhalter – cello 
Dane Little – cello 
Daniel Smith – cello 
Rudolph Stein – cello 
Steve Richards – cello 
Kevan Torfeh – cello 
Peter Sheridan – flute 
Heather Susan Greenberg – flute 
James Walker – flute 
Steve Kujala – flute 
Heather Clark – flute 
Martin Glicklich – flute 
David Shostac – flute 
Earle Dumler – oboe 
Barbara Northcutt – oboe 
Tommy Morgan – harmonica 
James Atkinson – french horn 
Steven Becknell – french horn 
Brad Warnaar – french horn 
Joseph Meyer – french horn 
Todd Miller – french horn 
Phillip Yao – french horn 
Gospel choir 
Paulina Aguirre
Carmen Carter
Lynn Blythe Davis
Alice Sanderson Echols
Cleto Escobedo II
Nikisha Greer
Bambi Natisse Jones
Kristle Murden
Dan Navarro
Kenny O'Brien
Darryl Phinnessee
Louis Price
Carmen Twillie
Gisa Vatcky
Julia Waters-Tillman
Maxine Waters-Willard
Oren Waters
Will Wheaton

Technical credits

Luis Miguel – producer
Alejandro Asensi – ejecutive producer
Juan Carlos Calderón – arrangements and musical direction
Francisco Loyo – music co-production
Rafa Sardina – engineer, mixer
Allen Sides – audio engineer
David Reitzas – audio mixing
Shari Sutcliffe – production coordinator
Wesley Seidman – recording assistant
Chris Jennings – recording assistant
Lizette Rangel – recording assistant
Matty Green – mix assistant
Alan Mason – mix assistant
Ron McMaster – mastering engineer
Alberto Tolot – photography
Jeri Heiden – graphic design
Jennifer Pyle – graphic design

Recording and mixing locations

Ocean Way Studios, Hollywood, CA – recording
Right Track Recording, New York, NY – recording
Chalice Studios, Hollywood, CA – mixing
Capitol Mastering, Hollywood, CA – mastering

Chart performance

Weekly charts

Monthly charts

Year-end charts

Sales and certifications

Release history

See also
2006 in Latin music
List of number-one albums of 2006 (Mexico)
List of number-one Billboard Top Latin Albums of 2006
List of number-one Billboard Latin Pop Albums from the 2000s
List of number-one debuts on Billboard Top Latin Albums

Notes

References 

2006 Christmas albums
Covers albums
Christmas albums by Mexican artists
Luis Miguel albums
Warner Music Latina albums
Spanish-language albums
Albums produced by Luis Miguel
Albums produced by Juan Carlos Calderón